The Rosenstein is a 735 m high mountain in the Swabian Jura above the town of Heubach near Schwäbisch Gmünd, Germany.

With its exposed position as head of the Alb it had been of strategic importance. Excavations in the caves on Rosenstein have found tools dating back to the Paleolithic period. Among the best-known caves are scouring the "Great" and "Dark hole". About the Western rock, the remnants of a medieval castle, Rosenstein castle ruins.

The Rosenstein is now a very popular recreational area, especially for climbers and mountain bikers.

See also
 Petrosomatoglyph

External links
 Bergsucht.de - climbing on Rosenstein

Mountains and hills of the Swabian Jura